Arrinton Narciso Mina Villalba (born 25 November 1982 in San Lorenzo) is an Ecuadorian football striker who plays for Clan Juvenil.

Club career
He was transferred to Barcelona from former club Manta Fútbol Club and was a regular starter for his club. On 27 October 2009 Huracán signed Mina on loan from Barcelona Guayaquil for one year.

In March joined Chornomorets Odessa in the Ukrainian Premier League on a 3-month loan until the end of the season with an option to prolong his contract based on his performances.

Barcelona SC

2012 season
In 2012, Mina rejoined Barcelona. Mina scored his first two goals in a game against Deportivo Cuenca. He finished the 2012 Ecuadorian Serie A season as top goal-scorer, with thirty goals to his name, the second highest global tally by a South American. His thirty goals was the most scored by a Barcelona player in a single season, which helped Barcelona secure its fourteenth title, not having won a league title since 1997.

América

2012–13 season
On 3 December 2012 Narciso Mina was signed by Mexican club América. He finished the Clausura 2013 scoring one goal against Atlante. He was the top scorer in the Copa MX tournament with eight goals.

2013–14 season
Mina scored his first league goal on 3 August in a 3–0 win against Atlas at the Estadio Azteca. He dedicated the goal to former América teammate and national team striker Christian Benítez, who died on 29 July. On 10 August he scored his second goal in three games played against Atlante in a 4–2 win in Cancún. Mina finished the Apertura tournament with five goals, though in his final match against Club León, which was also the league final, he was subbed off after a bad performance in which he missed four goal scoring opportunities. He was booed off the field and replaced by Luis Gabriel Rey.

Atlante
On 18 December 2013 Mina was sold to Atlante.

LDU Quito
His first game with Liga Deportiva Universitaria de Quito was against El Nacional, which was the opening game for LDU Quito of the 2015 season, he scored the first goal

Career statistics

Honours

Club
Barcelona SC
Serie A: 2012
América
Liga MX: Clausura 2013

Individual
Serie A Golden Shoe (2): 2011, 2012
Copa MX Golden Shoe: Clausura 2013 Copa MX

References

External links
 
 
 

1982 births
Living people
People from San Lorenzo, Ecuador
Association football forwards
Ecuadorian footballers
Ecuador international footballers
C.D. Cuenca footballers
L.D.U. Loja footballers
Deportivo Azogues footballers
Manta F.C. footballers
Barcelona S.C. footballers
FC Chornomorets Odesa players
C.S.D. Independiente del Valle footballers
Club América footballers
Atlante F.C. footballers
L.D.U. Quito footballers
San Martín de San Juan footballers
Mushuc Runa S.C. footballers
C.D. Clan Juvenil footballers
Ukrainian Premier League players
Ecuadorian expatriate footballers
Expatriate footballers in Ukraine
Ecuadorian expatriate sportspeople in Ukraine
Expatriate footballers in Mexico
Expatriate footballers in Argentina
2011 Copa América players
Liga MX players
Ascenso MX players
Ecuadorian Serie A players